The gens Caesulena was a Roman family during the late Republic.  It is best known from the orator Lucius Caesulenus, whom Cicero describes as a vulgar man, skilled at drawing suspicions upon persons, and in making them out to be criminals.  He was already an old man when Cicero heard him.

See also
 List of Roman gentes

Footnotes

Roman gentes